Scelodonta lineaticollis is a species of leaf beetle of West Africa. It was first described from Senegal by Maurice Pic in 1950, but according to the African Eumolpinae site, the type specimen bears the label "Gambia".

References

Eumolpinae
Beetles of Africa
Beetles described in 1950
Taxa named by Maurice Pic
Insects of West Africa